A constitutional referendum  was held in the Northern Mariana Islands on 4 November 1989. Voters were asked whether they approved of two amendments to the constitution. One on putting a limit on spending by the Legislature was approved, whilst the other was rejected.

Background
The proposal to amend the constitution to put a limit on spending was an initiative in the Legislature, and was passed by a three quarter majority in both houses. This meant that only a simple majority was required in the referendum.

It proposed amending Chapter II, sections 16 and 17 to read:

References

1989 referendums
1989 in the Northern Mariana Islands
Constitutional referendums in the Northern Mariana Islands